Henry John Aston (2 February 1881 – 4 February 1938) was an English footballer who played as a centre forward. He was born in Redditch and attended Astwood Bank School. After playing amateur football for several clubs, Aston served with the 2nd Battalion Durham Light Infantry, before joining the Royal Artillery. He became a professional footballer in February 1904 when West Bromwich Albion paid for him to be released from the army, making his debut in April of that year, against Derby County. Aston scored 10 goals in 26 appearances for Albion, before transferring to Walsall in June 1905. He later played for Willenhall Swifts and Clifton Victoria. Aston died in Bromsgrove in 1938.

References

1881 births
1938 deaths
Sportspeople from Redditch
English footballers
Association football forwards
West Bromwich Albion F.C. players
Walsall F.C. players
Willenhall F.C. players
English Football League players
Durham Light Infantry soldiers
Military personnel from Worcestershire
Royal Artillery soldiers
20th-century British Army personnel